Enterococcus durans is a species of Enterococcus.
It is a gram-positive, catalase- and oxidase-negative, coccus bacterium. The organism is also a facultative anaerobic organism. Prior to 1984, it was known as Streptococcus durans.

Certain strains have also been identified as producers of anti-inflammatory agents, which are being studied in medical research.

References

Further reading

External links
 Type strain of Enterococcus durans at BacDive -  the Bacterial Diversity Metadatabase

durans
 Anti-inflammatory agents
Bacteria described in 1937